The Hunter Armoured Fighting Vehicle (or Hunter AFV in short) is a tracked Singaporean armoured fighting vehicle jointly developed by ST Engineering, Defence Science and Technology Agency, and the Singapore Army. Intended to replace the Singapore Army's aging Ultra M113 armoured personnel carriers, it was commissioned in 2019. It is the Singapore Army's and the world's first fully digitalised platform, and is designed to provide armoured forces with enhanced capabilities to operate more effectively and efficiently in various phases of military operations. It was formerly known as ST Kinetics Next Generation Armoured Fighting Vehicle (NGAFV).

History 

Development of the Hunter started in 2006 as a project of the Singaporean Ministry of Defence (MINDEF)'s Defence Science and Technology Agency (DSTA). 

In March 2017, Singapore Technologies Engineering Ltd (ST Engineering) announced that its land systems arm, Singapore Technologies Kinetics Ltd (ST Kinetics), had been awarded a contract by MINDEF for the production and supply of the Next Generation Armoured Fighting Vehicle (NGAFV). 

The NGAFV would replace the Ultra M113 AFV as a key component of the Singapore Armed Forces’ mechanized forces which has been in service with the Singapore Army since the early 70s. Delivery of the Hunter began in 2019. The vehicle would be delivered in troop carrier, command and recovery variants.

The prototype model was exhibited at the Singapore Airshow in 2018.

In June 2019, the Hunter AFV was commissioned for the Singapore Army, with the 42nd Battalion, Singapore Armoured Regiment designated as the inaugural armour battle group operating the new platform.  The first armour battle group operating the platform was announced operationally ready by March 2022. 

In September 2022, the Singapore Army successfully concluded the inaugural overseas live-firing for the Hunter AFV in Oberlausitz, Germany. During which, the operational live-firing of the vehicle’s SPIKE-LR2 anti-tank guided missile was also successfully conducted.

Variants
 Armoured Fighting Vehicle (30mm and 2 SPIKE-LR2 ATGM)
 Command Vehicle
 Armoured Recovery Vehicle (Hunter ARV) 
 Engineer Vehicle (Hunter AEV) 
 Armoured Vehicle Launched Bridge (Hunter AVLB)
 Cockerill 3105 turret with 105mm gun (For Export)

Design
The vehicle has a tracked chassis and is crewed by a commander, a driver, and a gunner. The vehicle is equipped with an integrated combat cockpit, which allows the commander and gunner to use a common set of controls to operate the Hunter, and a drive by wire capability, which allows the vehicle commander to take over driving functions from the driver. The commander and gunners also have independent sights.

The Hunter has an MTU 8V-199 TE20 720hp (530kW) turbocharged diesel engine, & an HMX3000 Hydro-mechanical infinitely variable transmission.

It has InArm Hydro-pneumatic suspension provided by Horstman of the UK, now a subsidiary of Renk.

The AFV mounts an all-round surveillance system with a 360-degree field of vision, enabling closed-hatch operations, as well as a laser warning system.

The Hunter AFV is equipped with the Army Tactical Engagement and Information System (ARTEMIS), a command and control system that allows the crew to operate the vehicle in a fully digitised environment and enabling the wireless exchange of information between vehicles and formations. This is also integrated with the remote controlled weapon station to enable sharing of target information. It is also equipped with a Health and Utilisation Monitoring System (HUMS) to monitor the vehicle's health and allow predictive maintenance.

The Hunter AFV has a remotely controlled Samson Mk II turret from Rafael armed with a 30 mm Mk44 Bushmaster II cannon, with a magazine for 200 30x173mm rounds, two SPIKE anti-tank guided missiles, a 7.62 mm coaxial machine gun, and eight 76 mm smoke grenade launchers. It has a maximum range of 500 km and speed of 70 km/h.

Operators
 
 Singapore Army

Gallery

See also

Comparable AFV/IFVs
 Ajax
 ASCOD
 BMPT-72 Terminator
 Dardo IFV
 Kentaurus
 K21
 Lynx
 Namer
 Schützenpanzer Puma
 Tulpar IFV
 T-15 Armata
 WPB Anders
 ZBD-97

References

2019 establishments in Singapore
Armoured fighting vehicles of the post–Cold War period
Armoured fighting vehicles of Singapore